Albrecht of Saxe-Weissenfels (14 April 1659 in Halle – 9 May 1692 in Leipzig), was a German prince of the House of Wettin. He was the fifth and youngest son of August, Duke of Saxe-Weissenfels, and his first wife, Anna Maria of Mecklenburg-Schwerin.

Life 
By the will of his father (1680), Albrecht only received an income from his older brother's lands. Without lands of his own, he spend most of his time with his wife's relatives in Wertheim and converted to Catholicism.

As a member of the Fruitbearing Society, he received the surname der Muntere (the cheerful one).

In Wertheim on 22 June 1687, Albrecht married Christine Therese of Löwenstein-Wertheim-Rochefort. They had two daughters:

 Anna Christine (b. Wertheim, 17 July 1690 – d. Vienna, 5 March 1763).
 Maria Auguste (b. Wertheim, 4 February 1692 – d. Wertheim, 15 February 1692).

1659 births
1692 deaths
House of Saxe-Weissenfels
People from Halle (Saale)
Albertine branch
Sons of monarchs